Eritrichium (alpine forget-me-not) is a genus of flowering plants in the family Boraginaceae. It contains 78 species. Notable members include Eritrichium howardii and Eritrichium nanum.

Its native range stretches from temperate Eurasia, across Alaska to western central U.S.A. It is found in Europe (within Austria, France, Italy, Romania, Switzerland and Yugoslavia), in Siberia, (within Altay, Buryatiya, Chita, Krasnoyarsk and Tuva,) in Central Asia (within Kazakhstan, Kyrgyzstan, Tajikistan, Turkmenistan and Uzbekistan), in Western Asia (within Afghanistan, East Himalaya, Iran, Pakistan and West Himalaya), in China (within Inner Mongolia, Manchuria, Nepal, Qinghai, Tibet and Xinjiang,) in Eastern Asia (with Japan and Korea,) in Canada (within Northwest Territories and Yukon) and also in USA (within Alaska, Colorado, Idaho, Montana, New Mexico, Oregon, Utah,  Washington and Wyoming).

It was first published in Fl. Helv. vol.2 on page 57 in 1828.

Species
As accepted by Kew;

Eritrichium acicularum 
Eritrichium aldanense 
Eritrichium alpinum 
Eritrichium arctisibiricum 
Eritrichium arenosum 
Eritrichium aretioides 
Eritrichium argenteum 
Eritrichium axilliflorum 
Eritrichium baicalense 
Eritrichium boreale 
Eritrichium borealisinense 
Eritrichium caespitosum 
Eritrichium canum 
Eritrichium caucasicum 
Eritrichium chamissonis 
Eritrichium confertiflorum 
Eritrichium deltodentum 
Eritrichium deqinense 
Eritrichium dubium 
Eritrichium echinocaryum 
Eritrichium fetisowii 
Eritrichium fruticulosum 
Eritrichium gracillimum 
Eritrichium grandiflorum 
Eritrichium hemisphaericum 
Eritrichium howardii 
Eritrichium humillimum 
Eritrichium huzhuense 
Eritrichium incanum 
Eritrichium jacuticum 
Eritrichium jenisseense 
Eritrichium kamelinii 
Eritrichium kangdingense 
Eritrichium karavaevii 
Eritrichium latifolium 
Eritrichium laxum 
Eritrichium lianyongshanii 
Eritrichium longifolium 
Eritrichium longipes 
Eritrichium mandshuricum 
Eritrichium medicarpum 
Eritrichium mertonii 
Eritrichium minimum 
Eritrichium nanum 
Eritrichium nipponicum 
Eritrichium ochotense 
Eritrichium oligocanthum 
Eritrichium pamiricum 
Eritrichium pauciflorum 
Eritrichium pectinatociliatum 
Eritrichium pectinatum 
Eritrichium pendulifructum 
Eritrichium petiolare 
Eritrichium pseudolatifolium 
Eritrichium pseudostrictum 
Eritrichium pulvinatum 
Eritrichium pulviniforme 
Eritrichium putoranicum 
Eritrichium qofengense 
Eritrichium relictum 
Eritrichium sajanense 
Eritrichium sericeum 
Eritrichium serxuense 
Eritrichium sichotense 
Eritrichium sinomicrocarpum 
Eritrichium spathulatum 
Eritrichium splendens 
Eritrichium subjacquemontii 
Eritrichium tangkulaense 
Eritrichium thomsonii 
Eritrichium thymifolium 
Eritrichium tianschanicum 
Eritrichium tschuktschorum 
Eritrichium turkestanicum 
Eritrichium tuvinense 
Eritrichium uralense 
Eritrichium villosum 
Eritrichium wangwencaii

References

Boraginoideae
Boraginaceae genera
Flora of Austria
Flora of Siberia
Flora of the Russian Far East
Flora of Central Asia
Flora of the Caucasus
Flora of China
Flora of Mongolia
Flora of Japan
Flora of Korea
Flora of Subarctic America